Arenipiscis westolli is an extinct buchanosteid arthrodire placoderm.  Its fossils have been found in Emsian-aged marine strata of New South Wales, Australia.

The generic name, meaning "sand fish," refers to how the dermal surfaces of the armor have a pattern of tiny bumps, creating a granular texture.

References

Buchanosteidae
Placoderms of Australia